The Canalside Rail Trail is a  trail, partially on old railroad beds, from East Deerfield to Turners Falls in Montague, Massachusetts, USA. A short portion of the trail runs along town streets, but the majority is on a paved trail from which motor vehicles are prohibited. The northern terminus is Unity Park, on Barton's Cove in Turners Falls. The southernmost portion crosses the Connecticut River on the Canalside Rail Trail Bridge and ends at McClelland Farm Road in Deerfield. The trail was completed in spring 2008.

See also
 Turners Falls branch (New Haven)

References

External links

Canalside Rail Trail, Massachusetts Department of Conservation and Recreation
Canalside Rail Trail Map, Massachusetts Department of Conservation and Recreation

Protected areas of Franklin County, Massachusetts
Hiking trails in Massachusetts